Latus can refer to:
 Latus (game)
 Latus (anatomy)